Restriction-modification system may refer to:

 Restriction modification system
 Site-specific DNA-methyltransferase (adenine-specific)
 Site-specific DNA-methyltransferase (cytosine-N4-specific)